The Roman Catholic Deanery of Munich Perlach (German: "Dekanat München-Perlach") is a deanery of the Roman Catholic Church in the Archdiocese of Munich and Freising. At the moment, eight parishes belong to the deanery and there are currently 48,000 Catholics living in the deanery, which roughly encompasses the area of district number 16 of the City of Munich, "Ramersdorf-Perlach" and the area of the municipality Neubiberg, south-east of Munich. The diocesan agenda for structural reorganization (Strukturplan 2020) regrouped the eight parishes as three pastoral unions and the borough parish ("Stadtteilkirche") of Neuperlach. The new common patronage of "Christ the Redeemer") fused five previously independent parishes. The Dean is Christian Penzkofer and the Sub-Dean is Bodo Windolf.

List of churches in the deanery

Catholic organizations and groups in the deanery Perlach

Bund der Deutschen Katholischen Jugend (BDKJ) im Dekanat München-Perlach
The Catholic youth organizations (KjG and scouts) of the deanery comprise the Bund der Deutschen Katholischen Jugend (English: Association of the German Catholic Youth). The BDKJ Perlach represents the political, social and ecclesiastical interests of the Catholic youth of Perlach in the Church and society, particularly at the regional assembly of the BDKJ.

Deanery association of the Katholische junge Gemeinde in Perlach (kjg Perlach)
The katholische junge Gemeinde (kjg) Perlach is the youth organization bringing together the parish youth at deanery level. It organizes regular meetings and activities. It is part of the diocesan association of the Katholische junge Gemeinde (KjG München und Freising).

DPSG in Perlach
There are two local scouting groups in the deanery which belong to the Deutsche Pfadfinderschaft Sankt Georg (DPSG): The "Camilo Torres" troop was founded in 1967 and is part of the parish of Christ the Redeemer. The "Sankt Michael Perlach" troop is based in the parish of St. Michael. It was founded on 8 May 1992.

Kolping Organization in Neubiberg
There is a local branch of the Kolping Association in the parish of Rosenkranzkönigin in the municipality of Neubiberg. It was founded on 13 March 1988. Since then, the membership of the local group has increased and it now has 86 members.

Katholische Frauengemeinschaft Deutschlands (kfd)
There is also a local group of the Katholischen Frauengemeinschaft Deutschlands (kfd), which is one of the main Catholic women's associations in Germany. It is based in the Maximilian-Kolbe parish center in the parish of Christ the Redeemer. Until 1997 there was also a group in St. Michael in Altperlach.

References

External links
 Seelsorgeeinheiten in der Erzdiözese München und Freising nach Planung 2020 (PDF; 12 kB) (in German)
 Strukturplan 2020 - Dekanat München-Perlach (in German)

Neubiberg
Ramersdorf-Perlach